Codfish Island / Whenua Hou is a small island located to the west of Stewart Island in southern New Zealand. It reaches a height of  close to the south coast. The island is home to Sirocco, an internationally famous kākāpō, a rare species of parrot.

History and names
The island is one of many geographic features in New Zealand to have a dual place name, consisting of the English and Māori names separated by a slash. The English name "Codfish Island" refers to the endemic blue cod, which is fished commercially in surrounding waters by trapping in baited pots. 

The Māori name "" means "new land", which dates back to the early days of Pākehā settlement in New Zealand. Responding to concerns and allegations that local Māori women were being harassed by sealers on nearby Rakiura, the local Ngāi Tahu rangatira, Honekai, designated Whenua Hou as the site of a new mixed race settlement where early Pākehā could live with their Māori wives under his protection. This encouraged sealers to move to Whenua Hou, alleviating the issues which their presence had caused on nearby Rakiura and making Whenua Hou one of the first permanent mixed Māori and European settlements in the region.

Wildlife
Codfish Island / Whenua Hou is home to southern short-tailed bats, kākā, fernbirds, red-fronted and yellow-crowned parakeet (both referred to as kākāriki), Pacific black ducks and a recently introduced population of mōhua.

The island has been identified as an Important Bird Area by BirdLife International because of its significance as a breeding site for several species of seabirds, including Fiordland and yellow-eyed penguins, and mottled, Cook's and Whenua Hou diving petrels.

Kākāpō 

The first kākāpō were transferred to Codfish Island / Whenua Hou in 1987 from Rakiura in order to provide a safe haven for the birds. Following the eradication of possums and rats in 1998 and the transfer of weka to other islands, the island became a predator-free bird sanctuary and the focus of kākāpō recovery efforts. 

Codfish Island / Whenua Hou provides kakapo with a home similar to their original home of Rakiura. As it holds the majority of the breeding population of critically endangered kākāpō it has become the centre for kākāpō recovery. In 2002, 24 kākāpō chicks fledged on the island. In 2009 and 2016, 33 and 32 chicks fledged respectively. 

Its most famous resident is Sirocco, a kākāpō born in 1997; Sirocco became the government's "Official Spokesbird for Conservation" in 2010.

As of September 2021, 75 kākāpō reside on Codfish Island / Whenua Hou

Access
The island is visited by scientific researchers and Department of Conservation field workers along with volunteers working on conservation programs. The sole hut is located at Sealer's Bay in the northeast, with access by light aircraft or helicopter. The island is closed to casual visitors and unauthorised landing is prohibited.

See also 
 List of islands of New Zealand
 New Zealand outlying islands

References

External links

 Minders: The Kakapo caregivers of Codfish Island New Zealand Geographic

Islands of Southland, New Zealand
Stewart Island
Island restoration
Important Bird Areas of New Zealand